The Church Street Covered Bridge, also called the Village Covered Bridge, is a wooden covered bridge that crosses the North Branch of the Lamoille River (also known as the Kelly River) in Waterville, Vermont off State Route 109.  Built in the late 19th century, it is one of five covered bridges in a space of about five miles that cross the North Branch Lamoille.  It was listed on the National Register of Historic Places in 1974.

Description and history
The Church Street Bridge is located in the central village of Waterville, just west of the Waterville Union Church and the junction of Church Street with Vermont Route 109. It has a gabled metal roof, and its exterior is clad in vertical board siding which extends around to the insides of the portals. The siding on the sides ends short of the roof, leaving an open strip. It rests on abutments of dry laid stone capped with concrete. The trusses incorporate iron rods extending from the top of the diagonal bracing to the bottom chords. The bridge deck is wooden planking laid over steel I-beams, which carry the active load.

The bridge was built about 1877 by an unknown builder.  Along with two bridges in Waterville and two more in neighboring Belvidere, it is one of five covered bridges in a five-mile span of the North Branch Lamoille River, representing one of the densest concentrations of bridges over a single body of water in the state.

In 1967, the back wheels of a truck fell through the floor.  Subsequently, steel I-beams were installed under the bridge.  In 1970, the bridge survived a fire at a nearby house when firefighters hosed it down to prevent it from catching. In 2000, it was completely rebuilt.

See also
 
 
 
 
 List of covered bridges in Vermont
 National Register of Historic Places listings in Lamoille County, Vermont
 List of bridges on the National Register of Historic Places in Vermont

References

Buildings and structures in Waterville, Vermont
Bridges completed in 1877
Covered bridges on the National Register of Historic Places in Vermont
Queen post truss bridges in the United States
Wooden bridges in Vermont
Covered bridges in Lamoille County, Vermont
National Register of Historic Places in Lamoille County, Vermont
Road bridges on the National Register of Historic Places in Vermont
Historic district contributing properties in Vermont
1877 establishments in Vermont